Travis Shelton (born April 23, 1985) is an American former football wide receiver and professional boxer who was signed by the Denver Broncos in 2009 to 2010. Shelton also played for the CFL Winnipeg Blue Bombers in 2010. He Starred as the National leader in all purpose yards and Kickoff Return college football at Temple.

Early years
Competing in track in high school, Shelton finished third in the 200 metres  [PR.20.9] 
Took 2nd in at the 2004 Florida 4A state meet, behind Walter Dix,100 meters [PR.10.22] ahead of Chris Johnson, and Alonzo Phillips.

College career
In 2004, Shelton was named preseason 1st Team All American averaged 29 yards per with 532 yards all purpose scored one touchdown as a freshman on a 70-yard touchdown pass.

He was redshirted his sophomore year.

Sophomore wide receiver Travis Shelton has been named the Owlsports.com Player of the Month for October. Shelton, who played his first game with the Temple football team on October 12 at Clemson, was instrumental in helping the Owls snap a 20-game losing streak with a 28-14 win over Bowling Green on October 28.

Named the Wrangler College Football Player of the Week by The Sporting News for his performance in the Bowling Green win, Shelton was a human highlight reel in his three October games. The Fort Lauderdale, Fla. native posted a school-record 205 return yards on five kickoffs versus Clemson in his first action since the 2004 campaign. He broke the record held by Lew Lawhorn, who had 178 return yards in a 35-0 win over Boston College in 1992.

At Northern Illinois on Oct. 21, Shelton caught seven passes for 204 yards while generating 311 all-purpose yards. It marked the second most receiving yards in a game in school history after Van Johnson's 214 yards at Pittsburgh in 1996 and just the second 200-plus yard performance for an Owl receiver. Shelton grabbed four scoring aerials, was on the receiving end of a successful two-point conversion and had 113 yards on four kickoff returns. He became the first Temple player to catch four TDs in a game since Phil Goodman versus Boston College in 2003.

His 96-yard kickoff return versus the Bowling Green tied for the longest in the modern era of Owl football (since 1971) with Paul Loughran's return against Boston University in 1971 and was Temple's first kick returned to pay dirt since Makonnen's Fenton's 94-yarder against UConn in 2002. He also had a 43-yard touchdown grab to open the scoring for Temple.

Entering November, Shelton led the team in scoring (26 points) and all-purpose yards (780), while averaging 260.30 all-purpose yards per contest. He also was averaging a staggering 39.60 yards on 12 kickoff returns. In order to be included in the NCAA rankings, a player must compete in 75 percent of his team's games. If Shelton were eligible, he would lead the nation in both all-purpose running, ahead of Oklahoma's Adrian Peterson (204.00) and kickoff returns, ahead of SMU's Jessie Henderson (36.90)
As a third-year sophomore in 2006, Shelton set the record for longest kick return in the Owls' modern era. In a game against Northern Illinois, he amassed 311 all-purpose yards.  He finished the year with 778 return yards and a touchdown and 1,406 All-Purpose yards in playing in 6 games.

In 2007, his junior year, he finished with 20 receptions as a receiver, tying his career high with 1,310 all-purpose yYards.

During his senior year in 2008, Shelton again tied his career reception record. He also led the NCAA in average yards per kick return with 31.3 average yards, helping Temple to a No. 1 finish nationally in that category.

He finished his career at Temple with the 5,507 All-Purpose yards and with a school-record 2,507 total kickoff return yards, surpassing the previous record by almost 1,000 yards.  Prior to 2008, Mike Palys (1985–88) held the school record of 1,590 kickoff return yards.

Professional career

Denver Broncos
Selected in the 2009 NFL Draft, Shelton signed with the Denver Broncos.

Winnipeg Blue Bombers
On April 20, 2010, Shelton signed as a free agent with the Winnipeg Blue Bombers of the Canadian Football League. INJURED HIS HAMSTRING

Hartford Colonials
On August 3, 2010, Shelton signed as a free agent with the Hartford Colonials of the United Football League.

Personal
Shelton is the first cousin of both NFL wide receiver Devin Hester and NFL linebacker Andra Davis.

References

External links
 DyeStat profile for Travis Shelton

1985 births
Living people
Players of American football from Fort Lauderdale, Florida
American football wide receivers
American football return specialists
Temple Owls football players
Denver Broncos players
Hartford Colonials players
Alabama Vipers players